Hammer & Coop was part of a marketing campaign for automobile manufacturer Mini in 2007.  The campaign consisted of television commercials and a 6-episode video series that parodied action series from the 80s, especially Knight Rider.

In the series, Hammer (Bryan Callen) was a man of mystery and Coop was a 2007 Mini with artificial intelligence that spoke in a glib British voice.  Coop was the product of an apparent military contractor named Silverfox.

The campaign was created by Butler, Shine, Stern and Partners and the films were directed by Todd Phillips.

Episodes 

There was also a music video in which Hammer performed Heat of the Moment by the band Asia.

External links 
 HammerAndCoop

Advertising campaigns